In the classification of the archaeology of the Americas, the Post-Classic Stage is a term applied to some Precolumbian cultures, typically ending with local contact with Europeans. This stage is the fifth of five archaeological stages posited by Gordon Willey and Philip Phillips' 1958 book Method and Theory in American Archaeology.

 The Lithic stage
 The Archaic stage
 The Formative stage
 The Classic stage
 The Post-Classic stage

Cultures of the Post-Classic Stage are defined distinctly by possessing developed metallurgy. Social organization is supposed to involve complex urbanism and militarism. Ideologically, Post-Classic cultures are described as showing a tendency towards the secularization of society.

Postclassic Mesoamerica runs from about 900 to 1519 AD, and includes the following cultures: Aztec, Tarascans, Mixtec, Totonac, Pipil, Itzá, Kowoj, K'iche', Kaqchikel, Poqomam, Mam.

In the North American chronology, the "Post-Classic Stage" followed the Classic stage in certain areas, and typically dates from around AD 1200 to modern times.

See also 
Mexica Empire
Inca Empire

References

 
900 establishments
1519 disestablishments
1958 introductions
1950s neologisms
+5
+5
+5
History of indigenous peoples of North America